Thomas Wedgwood may refer to:
 Thomas Wedgwood III (1685–1739), English potter
 Thomas Wedgwood IV (1716–1773), English master potter
 Thomas Wedgwood (photographer) (1771–1805), English pioneer of photography